Robert "Bobby" Bandiera (born October 19, 1953) is an American rock guitarist, singer, and songwriter from New Jersey. Bandiera played rhythm guitar for Bon Jovi in live performances from 2005 until 2015 and for nearly two decades was lead guitarist for Southside Johnny and the Asbury Jukes. Bandiera and his band (The Bobby Bandiera Band) have backed Bruce Springsteen at benefit concerts.

Biography 
Bandiera began playing in clubs over 45 years ago at the age of 16. Originally, he was in a band called Holme from Orange, New Jersey. They debuted in 1970, and were the house band for years at Dodd's in Orange, New Jersey, as well as D'Jais in Belmar, New Jersey, where Bandiera still makes occasional appearances. 

A long-time presence on the Jersey Shore, Bandiera was associated with major acts. He was considered for the guitarist position in the E Street Band for the Born in the U.S.A. Tour in 1984, when Steven Van Zandt left the band, but this position went to Nils Lofgren. In 1985, Bandiera replaced Billy Rush as guitarist for Southside Johnny and The Asbury Jukes but in 2010 left the band. 
In the mid-1990s, Bandiera and Southside Johnny made a number of shows as a duo. Bandiera has also  played with Dave Edmunds, and has his own band, The Bobby Bandiera Band, which performs regularly in the New Jersey area when Bandiera is not on tour. Bandiera has had an active solo career, releasing three albums and often playing during Springsteen's Asbury Park holiday shows of the early 2000s. His most famous song is "C'mon Caroline," which he co-wrote with Bob Burger, another talented Jersey shore musician. He also does studio musician work and has appeared on albums by Cyndi Lauper, Patti Scialfa, and others.

In 2003, Bandiera toured with Bon Jovi during This Left Feels Right Live session. From 2005 until 2015, he played rhythm guitar in Bon Jovi's live performances. According to Jon Bon Jovi, he is on "permanent loan" to the band from Southside Johnny (having not played with the Jukes since 2010).

Discography

Albums 
 Bandiera · (Released 1991)
 Dog Loves You · (Released 1995)
 Is My Father There · (Released 2005)

References

External links 
 Bobby Bandiera home page
 Interview with Chorus and Verse (Aug. 2005)

1952 births
Bon Jovi members
American rock guitarists
American male guitarists
American male singers
Southside Johnny & The Asbury Jukes members
Jersey Shore musicians
Living people
Singers from New Jersey
People from Orange, New Jersey
Guitarists from New Jersey
20th-century American guitarists
21st-century American guitarists